Hillary Maritim (born 5 February 1973) is a Kenyan hurdler. He competed in the men's 400 metres hurdles at the 2000 Summer Olympics.

References

1973 births
Living people
Athletes (track and field) at the 2000 Summer Olympics
Kenyan male hurdlers
Olympic athletes of Kenya
Place of birth missing (living people)
African Games medalists in athletics (track and field)
African Games bronze medalists for Kenya
Athletes (track and field) at the 1999 All-Africa Games